Brook Stream (or Spiders Castle Dyke) is a tributary of the Great Stour river in Ashford, Kent, England.

The water can be bright orange at times because of iron deposits.

The stream runs from its source near Brook, 6.1 kilometres, north west to the Great Stour.

References

Rivers of Kent
Borough of Ashford